Sainte-Anne-de-Madawaska is a community in Madawaska County, New Brunswick, Canada. It held village status prior to 2023.

Sainte-Anne-de-Madawaska is located on the Saint John River, 30 kilometres southeast of Edmundston.

Forestry is the major industry in the area.

History

On 1 January 2023, Sainte-Anne-de-Madawaska amalgamated with the town of Saint-Léonard and parts of four local service districts to form the new town of Vallée-des-Rivières. The community's name remains in official use.

Geography 
Sainte-Anne-De-Madawaska is made up of several smaller communities including:
Fourche-à-Clark
Prime
Quisibis
Rang-des-Deschêne
Siegas
Siegas Lake Settlement
Sirois

Demographics

Population trend

Mother tongue (2016)

Attractions 

Sainte-Anne-de-Madawaska is known for its historical Catholic Church. Located on Principale Street, the village's place of worship was built in 1923, featuring St. Anne on the top of the establishment. Its location is based in the middle of the village on its highest promontory, reflecting the importance of the Roman Catholic religion in the parish.

The Sainte-Anne-de-Madawaska Church's architectural significance is what gives it local heritage value. It was constructed in the Romanesque style in 1923, which is mostly demonstrated by the beautiful Roman arches on both the outside and interior. The church, which is made of local granite, features a Latin cross layout and has a broad central nave and narrow transepts.

The church is very well known for the array of artworks that are connected to it. Edgar St-Pierre forged two enormous iron crosses that stand 16 feet tall, which stand above each of the two steeples. The main façade's roof was decorated with a large statue of St. Anne in 1947. Mario Mauro (1920-1985), a painter, created the frescoes of St. Anne and Notre-Dame-de-Lourdes in 1960.

Notable people

See also
List of communities in New Brunswick

References

Communities in Madawaska County, New Brunswick
Former villages in New Brunswick